The procuratorial coinage of Roman Judaea was minted by the prefects and procurators of the province between AD 6 and 66 in only one denomination and size, the bronze prutah.

Not all of the Procurators issued coinage. Those that did were Coponius, Marcus Ambivulus, Valerius Gratus, Pontius Pilate, Antonius Felix and Porcius Festus, who between them issued a total of 19 different coins.  The last three Procurators Lucceius Albinus, Gessius Florus and Marcus Antonius Julianus didn't issue any coins as the tidings of the First Jewish-Roman War was in the air and the leaders of the revolt started issuing their own coins.

Coponius

Coponius was the first Roman Prefect of Judaea, being appointed in 6 AD when Herod Archelaus, the son of Herod the Great, was deposed and banished to Gaul by Augustus. Coponius depicted the palm tree bearing two bunches of dates on his coinage, which previously had appeared only on extremely rare coins of Herod Antipas.  The palm tree design was later used to represent Judaea on coins issued by the Jews during the First and Second Revolts, as well as later Roman-issued Judaean-related pieces.

The obverse of Coponius's coins show an ear of barley. The representation of palm trees and barley was done out of sensitivity to Jewish belief not to depict a living creature, and especially not a human being, on their coinage; hence, there is no portrait of the Emperor Augustus on these coins. However, the inscriptions on the coins clearly proclaim that Judaea was occupied by Imperial Rome; hence, the Greek letters surrounding the barley read: [K]aisa-ros ["of Caesar"] with the date, also in Greek letters, under the palm.

Marcus Ambivulus

Marcus Ambivulus was the Prefect of Judaea from 9 - 12 AD. He issued a coin for each of the three years of his rule. Like those issued by Coponius, the coins of Ambivulus depicted a palm tree bearing two bunches of dates and an ear of barley.

Valerius Gratus

Valerius Gratus was Prefect of Judaea under the Emperor Tiberius. Gratus issued several different types of coins in as many years. The symbols represented on his coins included palm branches, lilies, cornucopia, grape leaves and amphorae.  His coins showed Caesar's title within a wreath, and the Emperor's name 'TIB' or his mother, Julia (IOYLIA), and the year of his reign above two cornucopiae.

Pontius Pilate

The bronze coins (or 'prutah') issued by Pontius Pilate between 26 and 36 AD are of especial interest to Christians and Jews because of his connection with Jesus Christ and his involvement in Jewish history. The evidence of his coinage and the Pilate inscription found at Caesarea seems to reveal that Pontius Pilate as Prefect was determined to promote a form of the Roman religion in Judaea regardless of whether this was offensive to the Jews. Unlike those of his predecessors, the coinage issued by Pilate depicts Roman symbolism connected with the imperial cult such as the simpulum and lituus. However, it has been argued that if Pilate was deliberately trying to offend the Jews he would have put the head of the Emperor on the obverse of his coinage. Instead, he depicted three ears of barley. A third type showed crossed palm branches and a wreathed inscription.

The lituus was the wand of an augur, and was used to interpret natural phenomenon such as lightning flashes, the flight of birds, etc. The simpulum was a ladle used to make libations during sacrifices and was a common symbol of the Roman priesthood. These symbols were guaranteed to offend Jewish religious sensibilities being placed on coinage that they would have to handle on a daily basis.

According to the Caesarea inscription, Pilate dedicated a Tiberieum to the deified Augustus. Philo wrote that Pilate was "...inflexible, merciless and obstinate...(and did not) wish to do anything that would please his subjects." Josephus stated that Pilate set up shields, also associated with the Roman imperial cult, in honour of Tiberius in the Jewish Temple in Jerusalem, which also caused great offence to the Jews, who protested until they were removed.

Antonius Felix

Felix was Procurator of Judaea under Claudius. His coins bear the names of Claudius, Julia Agrippina, Nero (as 'Caesar'), and Britannicus. The obverse of his coins show two shields and two spears crossed, while the reverse shows a six-branched palm tree bearing two bunches of dates. The depiction of military arms on these coins would have been a constant reminder to the Jews that handled them that they were under the jurisdiction of Rome.

Porcius Festus

Procurator under Nero, only one known coin type was issued by Festus, the obverse of which features a palm branch and the Greek legend KAICAPOC (Caesar), and the reverse NEPWNOC (Nero) in a wreath.

See also

List of historical currencies
Prutah

References

External links

The Jewish Virtual Library
Prutah exhibited at the Residence of the President of the State of Israel
Valerius Gratus coin, found at Emmaus 

Jews and Judaism in the Roman Empire
Coins of ancient Rome
Historical currencies, List of
Coins of Judea
Judea (Roman province)
Numismatics
Roman governors of Judaea